The 5th Legislative Assembly of British Columbia sat from 1887 to 1890. The members were elected in the British Columbia general election held in July 1886. William Smithe formed a government. Following his death in May 1887, Alexander Edmund Batson Davie became premier. After Davie died in 1889, John Robson became premier.

There were four sessions of the 5th Legislature:

Charles Edward Pooley served as speaker from 1887 until 1889 when he was named to cabinet. David Williams Higgins succeeded Pooley as speaker.

Members of the 5th General Assembly 
The following members were elected to the assembly in 1886:

Notes:

By-elections 
By-elections were held for the following members appointed to the provincial cabinet, as was required at the time:
Forbes George Vernon, Chief Commissioner of Lands and Works, elected June 4, 1887
John Herbert Turner, Minister of Finance, elected September 1, 1887
Theodore Davie, Attorney General, elected September 1, 1889

By-elections were held to replace members for various other reasons:

Notes:

Other changes 
Lillooet (dec. Edward Allen, March 31, 1890)

References 

Political history of British Columbia
Terms of British Columbia Parliaments
1887 establishments in British Columbia
1890 disestablishments in British Columbia
19th century in British Columbia